Chicken 224 is an Indian reserve of the Black Lake Denesuline First Nation in Saskatchewan. It is 170 kilometres southeast of Uranium City. In the 2016 Canadian Census, it recorded a population of 1379 living in 263 of its 280 total private dwellings. In the same year, its Community Well-Being index was calculated at 42 of 100, compared to 58.4 for the average First Nations community and 77.5 for the average non-Indigenous community.

Etymology

The three Chicken reserves were named after a Chief Chicken, early leader of the Black Lake band.

References

Indian reserves in Saskatchewan
Division No. 18, Saskatchewan